Zasavica can refer to:

 Zasavica, Dobretići, a village in Bosnia and Herzegovina
 Zasavica (Šamac), a village near Šamac, Bosnia and Herzegovina
 Zasavica (river), a river in Serbia
 Zasavica (bog), a bog in Serbia
 Zasavica I, a village in Serbia
 Zasavica II, a village in Serbia